Saluda Theatre is a historic movie theater located at Saluda, Saluda County, South Carolina. It was built in 1936, and is a two-story, stuccoed masonry building in the Art Deco style. The theater closed in 1981. It was restored after 1987, and is home to the Saluda Players.

It was added to the National Register of Historic Places in 1993.

References

External links
Cinema Treasures

Theatres on the National Register of Historic Places in South Carolina
Art Deco architecture in South Carolina
Buildings and structures in Saluda County, South Carolina
National Register of Historic Places in Saluda County, South Carolina
Theatres completed in 1936